WCLA (1470 AM) is a radio station broadcasting an adult standards format. Licensed to Claxton, Georgia, United States, the station is currently owned by W. Danny Swain and features programming from ABC Radio.

Previous logo

References

External links

CLA
Radio stations established in 1990